High Plains refers to one of two distinct land regions:

High Plains (United States), land region of the western Great Plains
High Plains (Australia), land region adjacent to the Great Dividing Range

See also 
 Altiplano (disambiguation), Spanish for high plains
 Western Plains (disambiguation), term used in Australia and the US